Vadala or Wadala is the surname of the following people:
Eleanor Vadala (born 1923), American chemist, materials engineer and balloonist
Giuseppina Vadalà (1824–1914), Italian patriot
Guido Vadalá (born 1997), Argentine football forward
Gurpartap Singh Wadala, Indian politician